is a Japanese scholar renowned for his expertise in Buddhist studies.

Ueki is an expert in the original Buddhist texts, including Sanskrit and Pali, which offer a comprehensive understanding of Buddhism's diachronic history, from its earliest beginnings (i.e., Early Buddhism) to the Mahayana sutras, such as the Lotus Sutra and Vimalakirti Sutra. Additionally, Ueki conducts detailed analyses of the Chinese and Japanese translations of these important sutras, providing a rich and multifaceted view of Buddhist philosophy and practice.

Career 
Masatoshi Ueki is a scholar whose research focuses on Buddhist philosophy and Buddhist thoughts. Born in Nagasaki, Japan, Ueki obtained his Bachelor of Physics and Master of Science degrees from Kyushu University. Prior to his work in academia, he worked as a journalist, specializing in fine arts and literature. In recognition of his exceptional storytelling skills, Ueki was awarded the "Cosmos, rookie of the year" award in 1992 for his piece titled "Circus girl."

Starting in 1991, Ueki studied under Professor Hajime Nakamura at the Eastern Institute. In 2002, Ueki received his Ph.D. (Humanity) from Ochanomizu University with a thesis entitled「仏教におけるジェンダー平等の研究──『法華経』に至るインド仏教からの考察」[Gender equality in Buddhism: An analysis of Indian Buddhism, from Early Buddhism to ‘the Lotus Sutra'] From 2008 to 2013, Ueki worked as an adjunct lecturer at Center for the Studies of World Civilizations, Tokyo Institute of Technology. He has also taught at NHK cultural center and Asahi culture center

In 2008, Ueki published “Bon-Kan-Wa Taisho Gendaigo Yaku, Hokekyo", 1st and 2nd volumes (『梵漢和対照・現代語訳　法華経』（上・下）, [The Lotus Sutra: A contrastive translation between Sanskrit-Chinese-Japanese], which consist of 1) Sanskrit texts, 2) Chinese translation by Kumarajiva, and 3) Japanese translation by the author). With this work, Ueki won the Mainichi Shuppan Bunka Sho.

He also translated ‘the Vimalakirti Sutra’, which was found in Potala Palace, Tibet, in 1999, into modern Japanese, and published   “Bon-Kan-Wa Taisho Gendaigo Yaku, Yuimakyo" (『梵漢和対照・現代語訳　維摩経』, [The Vimalakirti Sutra: A contrastive translation between Sanskrit-Chinese-Japanese]), and won the Papyrus Award in 2013.

In 2017, Ueki wrote a series of columns for the  Nishinippon Shimbun titled "Bukkyo 50 wa"(『仏教５０話』[50 Buddhist stories] ). His aim was to make the teachings of Buddhism accessible to a wider audience by explaining them using everyday concepts and common sense.

In 2018, April, Ueki was serving as a commentator on the NHK's "100 Pun de Meicho" (『１００分de名著』[Introducing a literary masterpiece in under 100 minutes]) broadcasting program.　

Ueki is a member of The Japan P.E.N Club, The Japanese Association of Indian and Buddhist Studies, and Japanese Association for Comparative Philosophy.

Talks

Publication

Publication in English 
•  Images of Women in Chinese Thought and Culture（with Robin Wang and Makiko Ueki）Hackett Publ. Inc., Massachusetts, 2003

•  Gender Equality in Buddhism, Asian Thought and Culture series vol. 46, Peter Lang Publ. Inc., New York, 2001

Publication in Japanese

Translation 
・“Therī-gāthā — Immortal Poems of Early Buddhist Nuns,” (2017)

・The Vimalakirti Sutra (2011)

・The Lotus Sutra (2008)

・“The Lotus Sutra — Translation into Modern Language of a Sanskrit Original”(2015)

Books 
(some major works by Ueki)

Columns 
『仏教５０話』(50 Buddhist stories) (2017) Nishinippon Shimbun.

Others 
See Japanese profile

Footnotes 

Japanese scholars of Buddhism
Buddhist studies scholars